Henry Vasnier (1832–1907), was a famous art collector, partner and wine merchant.

At his death, his collection of works and objets d'art (including works by Corot) were bequeathed to the Museum of Fine Arts at Reims. The Museum today possesses some major pieces of glass that once belonged to Vasnier, and there is a Boulevard Henry Vasnier in Reims named for him.

His temperament made him a libertine: he built a brothel and saloon called California near the village of Craonne in Picardy. He also built a zoo and a botanical garden of exotic plants, and planted vines on the hillsides in order to enlarge the vineyards at Pommery.

References

External links
Obituary

French art collectors
Business people from Reims
1832 births
1907 deaths